Pablo Nicolás Fernández Sosa (born 6 February 2003) is a Uruguayan professional footballer who plays as a midfielder for Rentistas.

Club career
Fernández is a youth academy graduate of Rentistas. He made his professional debut for the club on 1 March 2021 in a 5–0 league defeat against Plaza Colonia.

International career
Fernández is a current Uruguayan youth international. On 23 October 2021, he was named in Uruguay under-20 squad for friendlies against Costa Rica and Honduras.

Career statistics

Club

References

External links
 

Living people
2003 births
Uruguayan footballers
C.A. Rentistas players
Footballers from Paysandú
Association football midfielders
Uruguayan Primera División players